Present Tense is the fourth studio album by Wild Beasts, released 24 February 2014 on Domino Recording Company. It was preceded by the single "Wanderlust" released on the same day.

Background 
Following a two-year-long world tour in promotion of their third album Smother, the band admitted to feelings of burn out by the experience and in late 2012 announced that they would take a year off from touring to concentrate on writing and recording the follow-up. Seeking a fresh approach, the band chose not to work with long-time producer Richard Formby, who had helmed the recording of Two Dancers and Smother,  though they have not ruled out collaborating with him again in the future. Producers Leo Abrahams and Lexxx (who was also involved in the mixing of both records) were brought in to sharpen the band's focus and help them craft songs that continued to pursue the band's shift into electronic and synthesized sounds, yet with a more direct and aggressive feel in comparison to Smother. The album received acclaim from critics.

Track listing 
All songs written by Wild Beasts.

Chart positions

References

Wild Beasts albums
2014 albums
Domino Recording Company albums
Albums produced by Leo Abrahams